Ulaan Lake was a lake in the districts of Mandal-Ovoo and Bulgan, in Ömnögovi Province, Mongolia. It completely dried up in 1995.

References

Lakes of Mongolia
Former lakes of Asia
Ömnögovi Province